Jack Killifer (1898–1956) was an American film editor. He was employed by Warner Brothers from 1928 to 1943.

Selected filmography

 Lights of New York (1928)
 The Terror (1928)
 Conquest (1928)
 The Time, the Place and the Girl (1929)
 So Long Letty (1929)
 The Matrimonial Bed (1930)
 A Soldier's Plaything (1930)
 Smart Money (1931)
 The Match King (1932)
 Union Depot (1932)
 Female (1933)
 The Mayor of Hell (1933)
 Fashions of 1934 (1934)
 Babbitt (1934)
 Little Big Shot (1935)
 G Men (1935)
 Smarty (1935)
 Broadway Hostess (1935)
 The Right to Live (1935)
 Road Gang (1936)
 Times Square Playboy (1936)
 Bullets or Ballots (1936)
 That Certain Woman (1937)
 Marked Woman (1937)
 Swing Your Lady (1938)
 Men Are Such Fools (1938)
 They Made Me a Criminal (1939)
 The Roaring Twenties (1939)
 Torrid Zone (1940)
 High Sierra (1941)
 The Smiling Ghost (1941)
 Highway West (1941)
 The Man Who Came to Dinner (1942)
 Gentleman Jim (1943)
 Northern Pursuit (1943)
 Background to Danger (1943)
 The Hoodlum (1951)
 The Beast with a Million Eyes (1955)

References

Bibliography 
 Thomas McNulty. Errol Flynn: The Life and Career. McFarland, 2011.

External links 
 

1898 births
1956 deaths
People from Los Angeles
American film editors